The  is Japanese aerial lift line in Tokushima Prefecture, operated by Shikoku Cable. Opened in 1992, the line climbs to Tairyū-ji, the 21st temple of the Shikoku Pilgrimage.

Basic data
System: Aerial tramway, 2 track cables and 2 haulage ropes
Distance: 
Vertical interval
Between two ends: 
Maximum: 
Maximum gradient: 30°
Operational speed: 5.0 m/s
Passenger capacity per a cabin: 101
Stations: 2
Time required for single ride: 10 minutes

See also
List of aerial lifts in Japan

External links
 Shikoku Cable official website

Aerial tramways in Japan
1992 establishments in Japan
Anan, Tokushima